Matthias Bieber (born 14 March 1986) is a Swiss former professional ice hockey player. He played for ZSC Lions, SCL Tigers, EHC Kloten and SC Bern in the National League (NL)

Playing career
On 16 November 2012 he was signed to a five-year contract extension by the Kloten Flyers.

International play
Bieber participated at the 2011 IIHF World Championship as a member of the Switzerland men's national ice hockey team.

Career statistics

Regular season and playoffs

International

Awards and honours

References

External links

1986 births
Living people
SC Bern players
GCK Lions players
Ice hockey players at the 2014 Winter Olympics
EHC Kloten players
Olympic ice hockey players of Switzerland
SCL Tigers players
Ice hockey people from Zürich
Swiss ice hockey forwards
ZSC Lions players